Hoplistopus penricei is a moth of the family Sphingidae. It is known from the Kalahari, south-western Africa and Angola.

The length of the forewings is about 24 mm. The body and wing upper- and underside are smoky grey and very uniform in colour. The forewing upperside has a series of very thin, black discal streaks between the veins, ending with an oblique apical line. There are similar but shorter streaks on the veins at their tips. Both wing undersides are without markings. The hindwing upperside is unicolorous, the fringe is white with small smoky grey dots.

References

Sphingini
Moths described in 1903
Moths of Africa
Insects of Namibia
Insects of Angola